Rockey Vaccarella is a resident of St. Bernard Parish, Louisiana and a Hurricane Katrina survivor/activist. He attracted international attention in August 2006 for driving his Federal Emergency Management Agency trailer to the White House to thank President George W. Bush for the mobile homes provided to Katrina victims by the federal government.  He is also a former GOP candidate for city council in St. Bernard Parish.

Bush press conference with Vaccarella
President Bush and Vaccarella met together in a White House press conference on August 23, 2006. Bush began by introducing Vaccarella:

Vaccarella thanked the President for his efforts in aiding Katrina victims:

Political response
Democratic Minority Leader Nancy Pelosi called the press conference a "public relations blitz that the survivors of Katrina [could] ill afford."

References

External links
Forgotten on the Bayou: Rockey's Mission to the White House (archived link, November 2, 2010)
5 years later: Rockey's new mission (archived link, July 11, 2011)

Living people
Year of birth missing (living people)
Louisiana Republicans
People from New Orleans